Taste receptors for bitter substances (T2Rs/TAS2Rs) belong to the family of G-protein coupled receptors and are related to class A-like GPCRs. There are 25 known T2Rs in humans responsible for bitter taste perception.

Bitter taste receptor hTAS2R14 is one of the human bitter taste receptors, recognizing an enormous variety of structurally different molecules, including natural and synthetic bitter compounds.

Gene 
TAS2R14 gene (Taste receptor type 2 member 14) is a Protein Coding gene. This gene maps to the taste receptor gene cluster on chromosome 12p13.

An important paralog of this gene is TAS2R13.

SNPs 
Taste receptors harbor many polymorphisms, and several SNPs have a profound impact on the gene function and expression.

Data obtained from 1000 genomes project.

Mutagenesis data (obtained from BitterDB)

3D model (from BitterDB) 
A homology model can be found and downloaded here.

Signal transduction pathways of T2Rs 
TAS2Rs activation produces modulation of a broad range of signal transduction pathways. Stimulation of a GPCR receptor, coupled to Gαq, results in the activation of phospholipase C β2 (PLC), which then stimulates the second messengers 1,4,5-inositol trisphosphate (IP3) and diacylglycerol (DAG). IP3 causes the release of Ca+2 from intracellular stores. Calcium opens Ca-activated TRP ion channels and leads to depolarization of the cell as well as to release of neurotransmitters.

Ligands (from BitterDB) 
Up to now, 151 ligands were identified for T2R14 and are summarized in BitterDB, in addition to 12 synthetic flufenamic acid derivatives.

Function 

This gene product belongs to the family of candidate taste receptors that are members of the G-protein-coupled receptor superfamily. These proteins are specifically expressed in the taste receptor cells of the tongue and palate epithelia. They are organized in the genome in clusters and are genetically linked to loci that influence bitter perception in mice and humans. In functional expression studies, TAS2R14 responds to (−)-α-thujone, the primary neurotoxic agent in absinthe, and picrotoxin, a poison found in fishberries. This gene maps to the taste receptor gene cluster on chromosome 12p13.

TAS2R14 is also expressed in the smooth muscle of human airways, along with several other bitter taste receptors. Their activation in these cells causes an increase in intracellular calcium ion, which in turn triggers the opening of potassium channels which hyperpolarize the membrane and cause the smooth muscle to relax. Hence, activation of these receptors leads to bronchodilation.

Extra-oral roles of TAS2R14 
TAS2R14 was shown to be expressed in many tissues in the human body including the heart, thyroid, stomach, skin, urogenital, immune system, and more.

TAS2R14 extra-oral function 

 In the respiratory system, several TAS2R subtypes: TAS2R4, TAS2R16, TAS2R14 and TAS2R38, were found to play important roles in innate immune nitric oxide production (NO).
 T2R14 causes inhibition of IgE-dependent mast cells.
 Associations between single nucleotide polymorphisms in TAS214 gene and male infertility were observed.

See also 
 Taste receptor

References

Further reading 

 
 
 
 
 
 
 
 
 

Human taste receptors